Poliziotteschi (singular poliziottesco) constitute a subgenre of crime and action films that emerged in Italy in the late 1960s and reached the height of their popularity in the 1970s. They are also known as polizieschi all'italiana, Euro-crime, Italo-crime, spaghetti crime films, or simply Italian crime films. Influenced by both 1970s French crime films and gritty 1960s and 1970s American cop films and vigilante films, poliziotteschi films were made amidst an atmosphere of socio-political turmoil in Italy known as Years of Lead and increasing Italian crime rates. The films generally featured graphic and brutal violence, organized crime, car chases, vigilantism, heists, gunfights, and corruption up to the highest levels. The protagonists were generally tough working class loners, willing to act outside a corrupt or overly bureaucratic system.

Etymology of the noun 
In Italian, poliziesco is the grammatically correct Italian adjective (resulting from the fusion of the noun polizia "police" and the desinence -esco "related to", akin to the English "-esque") for police-related dramas, ranging from Ed McBain's police procedural novels to forensic science investigations. Poliziesco is used generally to indicate every detective fiction production where police forces (Italian or foreign) are the main protagonists.

Instead the term poliziottesco, a fusion of the words poliziotto ("policeman") and the same -esco desinence, has prevailed (over the more syntactically-correct Poliziesco all'Italiana) to indicate 1970s-era Italian-produced "tough cop" and crime movies.  The prevalence of Poliziottesco over Poliziesco all'Italiana closely follows the success of the term Spaghetti Western over Western all'Italiana, being shorter and more vivid – though in both instances the term that has come to be used more frequently by English-speaking fans of the genre (poliziotteschi, Spaghetti Westerns) was originally used pejoratively by critics, to denigrate the films themselves and their makers.

History

Although the subgenre has its roots in Italian heist films of the late 1960s, such as Bandits in Milan (Banditi a Milano, 1968) by Carlo Lizzani, it was also strongly influenced by such rough-edged American police thrillers of the late 1960s and early 1970s as Bullitt, Dirty Harry, The French Connection, Magnum Force, and Serpico; the 1970s wave of American vigilante films, including 1974's Death Wish; the increase of cynicism and violence in French crime films; the resurgence of mob films in the wake of The Godfather; French and American noir and neo-noir films; and the rise of exploitation films in the late 1960s and 1970s. More generally, the genre was also heavily influenced by real-life crime and unrest in 1970s Italy during the period known as the anni di piombo (political violence, kidnappings, assassinations, bank robberies, political militant terrorism, impending oil crisis, political corruption, organized crime-related violence, and recession).

Just as American police films, American crime thrillers, and American vigilante films of the time focused on the crime waves and urban decline in the United States of the 1960s and 1970s, poliziotteschi were set in the context of, or directly addressed, the sociopolitical tumult and violence of Italy's anni di piombo, or the "Years of Lead", a period of widespread social unrest, political upheaval, labor unrest, rising crime, political violence, and political terrorism from the 1960s to 1980s. During this period, paramilitary and militant political terrorist groups, both on the far left (e.g. the Red Brigades) and far right (e.g. the neo-fascist Nuclei Armati Rivoluzionari) engaged in kidnappings, assassinations, and bombings (such as the Piazza Fontana bombing and 1980 Bologna train station bombing). At the same time, there was a  period of especially violent conflict and disorder within the Sicilian Mafia, kicked off with the "First Mafia War" of the 1960s and culminating in the "Second Mafia War" of the early 1980s. Italian organized crime groups such as the Sicilian Mafia, the Camorra, and especially the Roman Banda della Magliana were actively involved in both criminal and political activities during this time, carrying out bombings and kidnappings, making deals with corrupt politicians, and forming strong ties to extreme far right groups and neo-fascist terrorist organizations. Accordingly, poliziotteschi films such as Execution Squad (1972) often featured political extremists and paramilitary or terrorist groups alongside or in addition to the more commonly featured apolitical mafiosi and gangster criminal elements found in Italian crime films.

Due in part to the genre's often ostensibly negative portrayal of political activists and militants, especially leftist militants, and its seeming endorsement of vigilantism and "tough-on-crime" or "law and order" stances, some poliziotteschi films (such as 1976's The Big Racket) were criticized by then-contemporaneous critics and accused of exploiting conservative fears of rising crime and political upheaval while containing reactionary, pro-violence, or even quasi-Fascist ideological elements in their overarching message. These critiques were similar to those leveled at the 1970s American "vigilante films" of the same period, such as 1974's Death Wish, films by which the poliziotteschi genre were considerably influenced.

In retrospect, despite contemporaneous claims in the 1970s of overly conservative or reactionary themes within the genre, film historians such as Louis Bayman and Peter Bondarella contend that, in fact, poliziotteschi films generally presented a more multi-faceted, complex outlook on the political turmoil and crime waves of the time, as well as violence in general, with Bayman and author Roberto Curti in particular arguing that the genre generally used political conflicts and violence for largely apolitical tension-building and cathartic or emotional purposes rather than to promote any particular political agendas. Curti notes that the genre's protagonists often simultaneously displayed both right-wing and left-wing views, and protagonists were often working class while villains were often wealthy right-wing conservatives. The film Caliber 9 (1972), for instance, features protagonists of both right-wing and leftist ideologies and offers differing views on the causes of crime and the true antagonists of law-abiding Italian society, while Execution Squad reveals the actual antagonists of the film to be right-wing reactionary, "tough-on-crime" ex-police officers and vigilantes rather than the initially suspected leftist militants. Rather than explicitly supporting violence or vigilantism, the genre just as often displayed a morally ambiguous or aloof position on these themes, or even presented vigilantism and violence as a no-win situation. Though poliziotteschi films have been viewed by some critics as condemning a "liberal" or "weak" judiciary system as ineffectual in its treatment of criminals, the genre also suggests a more general distrust of authority, whether left-wing or right-wing, by portraying right-wing law enforcement, politicians and businessmen as hopelessly corrupt and manipulative. According to Bondarella, the "classic" poliziotteschi film reveals "almost universal suspicion of the very social institutions charged with protecting Italian society from criminal violence."

With directors such as Fernando Di Leo and Umberto Lenzi and actors such as Maurizio Merli and Tomas Milian, poliziotteschi films became popular in the mid-1970s after the decline of Spaghetti Westerns and Eurospy genres. The subgenre lost its mainstream popularity in the late 1970s as Italian erotic comedy and horror films started topping the Italian box office.

Although based around crime and detective work, poliziotteschi should not be confused with the other popular Italian crime genre of the 1970s, the giallo, which, to English-speaking and non-Italian audiences, refers to a genre of violent Italian murder-mystery thriller-horror films. Directors and stars often moved between both forms, and some films could be considered under either banner, such as Massimo Dallamano's What Have They Done to Your Daughters? (1974).

The poliziottesco subgenre gradually declined in popularity during the late 1970s. Screenwriter Dardano Sacchetti, who was unhappy with what he deemed the genre's "fascistic" undertones, credits himself for "destroying it from the inside", by making it evolve into self-parody. By the end of the decade, the most successful films associated with the genre were crime-comedy pictures, which gradually evolved towards pure comedy.

Directors include

 Mario Bianchi
 Alfonso Brescia
 Enzo G. Castellari
 Bruno Corbucci
 Damiano Damiani
 Alberto De Martino
 Massimo Dallamano
 Ruggero Deodato
 Lucio Fulci
 Mario Caiano
 Marino Girolami
 Romolo Girolami
 Umberto Lenzi
 Fernando Di Leo
 Carlo Lizzani
 Sergio Martino
 Stelvio Massi
 Giuliano Montaldo
 Elio Petri
 Sergio Sollima
 Duccio Tessari

Actors include

 Mario Adorf
 Ursula Andress
 Carroll Baker
 Martin Balsam
 Helmut Berger
 Barbara Bouchet
 Sal Borgese
 Marcel Bozzuffi
 Charles Bronson
 Luciano Catenacci
 Adolfo Celi
 Giovanni Cianfriglia
 Joan Collins
 Richard Conte
 Joseph Cotten
 Alain Delon
 George Eastman
 Mel Ferrer
 Klaus Kinski
 Angelo Infanti
 Leonard Mann
 Luc Merenda
 Maurizio Merli
 Mario Merola
 Tomas Milian
 Gordon Mitchell
 Gastone Moschin
 Franco Nero
 Jack Palance
 Oliver Reed
 Fernando Rey
 Edward G. Robinson
 Luciano Rossi
 Antonio Sabàto Sr.
 Telly Savalas
 John Saxon
 Henry Silva
 Woody Strode
 Fabio Testi
 Massimo Vanni
 Gian Maria Volonté
 Eli Wallach
 Fred Williamson

Selected films

 Bandits in Milan (Banditi a Milano, 1968)
 Detective Belli (Un Detective, 1969)
 Violent City (Città violenta, 1970)
 Investigation of a Citizen Above Suspicion (Indagine su un cittadino al di sopra di ogni sospetto, 1970)
 Execution Squad (La polizia ringrazia, 1972)
 Caliber 9 (Milano calibro 9, 1972)
 Manhunt (La mala ordina, 1972)
 Tony Arzenta (1973)
 High Crime (La polizia incrimina la legge assolve, 1973)
 The Violent Professionals (Milano trema – la polizia vuole giustizia, 1973)
 Revolver (1973)
 The Great Kidnapping (La polizia sta a guardare, 1973)
 The Boss (Il Boss, 1973)
 Flatfoot (Piedone lo sbirro, 1973)
 Gang War in Milan (Milano rovente, 1973)
 The Police Serve the Citizens? (La polizia è al servizio del cittadino?, 1973)
 Emergency Squad (Squadra volante, 1974)
 Street Law (Il cittadino si ribella, 1974)
 Almost Human (Milano odia: la polizia non può sparare, 1974)
 What Have They Done to Your Daughters? (La polizia chiede aiuto, 1974)
 Kidnap (Fatevi vivi, la polizia non interverrà, 1974)
 The Last Desperate Hours (Milano: il clan dei calabresi, 1974)
 Shoot First, Die Later (Il poliziotto è marcio, 1974)
 Killer Cop (La polizia ha le mani legate, 1975)
 Manhunt in the City (L'uomo della strada fa giustizia, 1975)
 Mark of the Cop (Mark il poliziotto, 1975)
 Mark Shoots First (Mark il poliziotto spara per primo, 1975)
 Gambling City (La città gioca d'azzardo, 1975)
 Kidnap Syndicate (La città sconvolta: caccia spietata ai rapitori, 1975)
 Silent Action (La polizia accusa: il Servizio Segreto uccide, 1975)

 Syndicate Sadists (Il giustiziere sfida la città, 1975)
 Violent Rome (Roma violenta, 1975)
 Violent Naples (Napoli violenta, 1976)
 A Special Cop in Action (Italia a mano armata, 1976)
 Mister Scarface (l Padroni della città, 1976)
 The Cop in Blue Jeans (Squadra antiscippo, 1976)
 Fear in the City (Paura in città, 1976)
 The Big Racket (Il grande racket, 1976)
 Strange Shadows in an Empty Room also known as Blazing Magnum (Una magnum special per Tony Saitta, 1976) 
 Live Like a Cop, Die Like a Man (Uomini si nasce poliziotti si muore, 1976)
 The Tough Ones (Roma a mano armata, 1976)
 Free Hand for a Tough Cop (Il trucido e lo sbirro, 1976)
 Colt 38 Special Squad (Quelli della Calibro 38, 1976)
 The Cynic, the Rat & the Fist (Il cinico, l'infame, il violento, 1977)
 Weapons of Death (Napoli spara!, 1977)
 The Heroin Busters (La via della droga, 1977)
 The Criminals Attack, The Police Respond (La malavita attacca, la polizia risponde!, 1977)
 A Man Called Magnum (Napoli si ribella, 1977)
 Double Game (Torino violenta, 1977)
 Beast with a Gun (La belva con mitra, 1977)
 Convoy Busters (Un poliziotto scomodo, 1978)
 Brothers Till We Die (La banda del gobbo, 1978)
 The Iron Commissioner (Il commissario di ferro, 1978)
 Blood and Diamonds (Diamanti sporchi di sangue, 1978)
 From Corleone to Brooklyn (Da Corleone a Brooklyn, 1979)
 Hunted City (Sbirro, la tua legge è lenta... la mia no!, 1979)
 The Rebel (Poliziotto, solitudine e rabbia, 1980)
 Contraband (Luca il contrabbandiere, 1980)

The Best Cop Movies You’ve Never Heard Of: ‘Poliziotteschi’ Films Get Their Due|IndieWire

 See also 

Cinema of Italy
Gangster film
Mafia film

References

Further reading
  Roberto Curti, Italia odia: il cinema poliziesco italiano. Lindau, 2006, . 
  Daniele Magni, Silvio Giobbio, Ancora più... Cinici infami e violenti – Guida ai film polizieschi italiani degli anni '70'', Bloodbuster Edizioni, 2010, .

External links 
 Poliziotteschi – The Final Take at Allmovie
 Pollanet Squad – Poliziotteschi data base 
 RDB Article 

Italian films by genre
Film genres
1970s in film
1980s in Italian cinema